Alan Lake Hilder (8 October 1901 – 2 May 1970) was an English amateur cricketer who played first-class cricket between 1924 and 1930. He played primarily for Kent County Cricket Club. He was born in Beckenham, then part of Kent, in 1901.

Hilder was educated at Cottesmore School and Lancing College. He played cricket for both, heading the batting averages for Lancing in 1920, and played for Kent's Second XI later the same year for the first time.

He made his first-class cricket debut for Kent in June 1924 against Essex at Gravesend. He scored a century in Kent's second innings of the match and set a Kent record for the 8th wicket in first-class cricket which stood until 2007, scoring 157 runs in partnership with Charlie Wright. This was Hilder's only century of his career and he was considered to have "never afterwards approached that form". He played 14 times for Kent, his final match coming in 1929.

Hilder toured Jamaica in 1926/27 and 1927/28 with teams led by Lionel Tennyson, playing eight first-class matches, and in 1928/29 in a non-first-class team led by Julien Cahn. He played his final first-class match in 1930, his only one for MCC, but continued to play cricket for various amateur teams until after World War II, including touring Egypt in 1932 in a team led by Hubert Martineau.

He died at St Leonards-on-Sea in Hastings, East Sussex in 1970 aged 68.

References

External links

1901 births
1970 deaths
English cricketers
Kent cricketers
Marylebone Cricket Club cricketers
L. H. Tennyson's XI cricket team
English cricketers of 1919 to 1945